Jacob M. Bushue (born May 15, 1992) is an American professional soccer player who plays as a midfielder for USL Championship club Las Vegas Lights FC.

Career

Youth
Bushue played youth soccer with the Chicago Magic from 2006-2010. Bushue's Chicago Magic team was a Dallas Cup Semi-Finalist in 2009. His teams also went to the US Soccer Academy Finals in both 2008 and 2009. Bushue was invited to the Adidas ESP Camp in 2008 and 2009.

College
He played college soccer at Indiana University from 2010 to 2013. During his career at Indiana, Bushue was a part of the team that won the 2012 National Championship. While at Indiana University, Bushue also won the 2010 Big Ten Conference regular season championship and the 2013 Big Ten Conference men's soccer tournament championship, and was named to the All-Tournament Team. During his career at Indiana, Bushue played in 86 games and made 79 starts for the Hoosiers, scoring 6 goals and 10 assists. After his career at Indiana, Bushue was invited to the 2014 MLS Draft Combine.

Professional
On January 15, 2015, Saint Louis FC of the USL announced the signing of Bushue for the 2015 season. He scored his first professional goal in a match on September 12 against the Charlotte Independence at World Wide Technology Soccer Park, and was named to the USL's Team of the Week for his performance.

On November 9, 2016 Saint Louis FC released Bushue

Bushue signed with the Finnish team Bollklubben-46 for the 2017 campaign. BK-46 plays in the third level of Finnish soccer as of 2017.

Bushue joined FC Haka for the 2019 season.

On January 13, 2022 he signed with Jaro.

Personal life
Bushue grew up in Champaign, Illinois. His parents are Doug and Katy Bushue. Jacob and his sister Megan became the first brother–sister combination to win the News-Gazette player of the year award. Bushue attended Champaign Centennial High School, graduating in December 2009.

Honors
FC Haka
 Ykkönen Winner: 2019

FF Jaro

 Ykköscup Winner: 2022

References

External links

Living people
1992 births
American expatriate soccer players
American soccer players
Association football midfielders
Chicago Fire U-23 players
Ekenäs IF players
FC Haka players
FF Jaro players
Las Vegas Lights FC players
Indiana Hoosiers men's soccer players
Saint Louis FC players
Soccer players from Illinois
Sportspeople from Champaign, Illinois
USL Championship players
USL League Two players
Kakkonen players
Ykkönen players
Veikkausliiga players
Expatriate footballers in Finland
American expatriate sportspeople in Finland
Bollklubben-46 players